Nyssodrysternum freyorum is a species of beetle in the family Cerambycidae. It was described by Gilmour in 1963. 2426365450

References

Nyssodrysternum
Beetles described in 1963